Charles Yonge may refer to:

 Charles Maurice Yonge (1899–1986), British marine biologist 
 Charles Duke Yonge (1812–1891), British historian